The Show! Music Core Chart is a record chart on the South Korean MBC television music program Show! Music Core. Every week, the show awards the best-performing single on the chart in the country during its live broadcast. This is a list of 2019 winners.

Chart history

Notes

References 

2019 in South Korean music
2019 record charts
Lists of number-one songs in South Korea